Yervand Mesropi Krbachyan (born 1 October 1971) is an Armenian former football defender and current manager. He was also capped for the USSR U-20 team at the 1991 FIFA World Youth Championship.

External links

 

1971 births
Footballers from Yerevan
Living people
Armenian footballers
Armenian football managers
Armenia international footballers
Armenian expatriate footballers
Soviet footballers
FC Ararat Yerevan players
PFC CSKA Moscow players
FC Zenit Saint Petersburg players
FC Pyunik players
FC Moscow players
Expatriate footballers in Russia
Soviet Armenians
Soviet Top League players
Armenian Premier League players
Russian Premier League players
FC Irtysh Omsk players
Association football defenders